"Te fuiste" is a bilingual Spanish-language and English language dance hit by Spanish music producer and DJ Jose de Rico and the Dominican-Spanish reggaeton, house, Latin and dance singer Henry Mendez. It is their debut joint chart hit. 

"Te fuiste" became a big hit in Spanish night clubs and made it to #34 in the Spanish Singles Chart, and then became an international hit for them in Europe and internationally.

Track list
"Te fuiste" (original mix) (3:21)
"Te fuiste" (extended mix) (4:51)
"Te fuiste" (Willy Fontana remix) (3:40)

Chart performance

Willy Fontana remix
A remix by Willy Fontana released in November 2012 in France became a chart success on the SNEP chart, the official French Singles Chart.

In popular culture
The song gained more publicity after the program Les Marseillais à Miami broadcast on the French television channel W9 used it as its theme song (générique) adding footage and additions to the track.

References

2012 singles
Spanglish songs
2012 songs